The Access 303 is a single or two crew sailing keelboat, which is recognised by the International Sailing Federation as an international class. It is typically regarded as being a beginner's dinghy.

Performance and design
The Access 303 is similar to the Access 2.3 of the same class. It has the same joystick control, as well as the high boom and the setup whereby the helm and crew are sat facing forwards. It also has the same electric servo-assisted drives, making it suitable for people with physical disabilities.

Like the 2.3 the 303 has the same low ballast and high sides, which adds to the stability of the boat.

The rigging of the 303 differs from the 2.3 in that it has been raised and a jib has been added. Although the jib is self-tacking the addition of it to the rigging does mean that the crew have an extra sail to trim which adds some complexity in comparison to the 2.3. Another change from the 2.3 is the possibility to sail the 303 as a two-man boat, although it is still possible to sail it solo. This means that the boat is suitable for coaching, as the coach can sit in the boat with the crew and let them run over the various aspects of control in a whilst on the water, and can take complete control of the boat if necessary.

Access 303 sport
There is also an Access 303 sport, which is single crew only, and is designed for more experienced sailors who wish to try sailing solo.

Events

World Championships

Para World Sailing Championships

Men

Women

See also
Access 2.3
Access Liberty (keelboat)

References

External links
 Official Access 303 Class Association Website
  ISAF Access 303 web page
  ISAF Homepage

Classes of World Sailing
Keelboats